The 1956 Star World Championship was held in Naples, Italy in 1956.

Results

References

Star World Championships
1956 in sailing
Sailing competitions in Italy
1956 in Italian sport